Swedish Lithuania, officially known as the Grand Duchy of Lithuania (Swedish: Storfurstendömet Litauen, Latin: Magnus Ducatus Lituaniæ), was a dominicum directum protectorate of the Swedish Empire under the rule of King Charles X Gustav in accordance with the Union of Kėdainiai. It de jure existed from 1655 until 1657 when it was terminated and fully reincorporated into the Polish–Lithuanian Commonwealth.

Swedish occupation 

In 1654, the Tsardom of Russia launched its invasion against the Polish–Lithuanian Commonwealth, which resulted in huge swathes of the territory falling into the hands of the Russian army. Noting the weak military performance of the Commonwealth, the Swedish Empire sought to take advantage of the political turmoil and occupy parts of the Polish–Lithuanian state: Sweden wanted to make Lithuania a permanent part of its imperial domain as the territory was strategically important in securing the Baltic Sea from Russia. In the summer of 1655, the Swedish army invaded Western Poland and began threatening to do the same to Lithuania. After learning about King John II Casimir fleeing the country, Lithuanian magnate Jonušas Radvila (Janusz Radziwiłł) and other members of the Lithuanian nobility began considering negotiations with Sweden.

Establishment

Treaty of Kėdainiai 

On 17 August 1655, the Treaty of Kėdainiai was signed by Radvila and other pro-Swedish signatories. The treaty laid out certain conditions — the Lithuanian nobility wanted Sweden to protect Lithuania from Moscow, guarantee the country's neutrality in the conflict, political and religious freedoms. These conditions were rejected as they also vaguely mentioned Lithuania having the right to leave Sweden. The Swedish also avoided directly participating in the conflict with the Tsardom of Russia because, in reality, they didn’t have enough manpower in Swedish Livonia to properly assist Lithuania in case of need. Despite this, Sweden promised Lithuania that it would help them in reclaiming their lost territory.

Union of Kėdainiai 

On 20 October 1655, over 1,000 nobles, mostly from Samogitia, gathered at the Kėdainiai Manor, signed the Union of Kėdainiai on behalf of the Grand Duchy of Lithuania, dissolved the Polish–Lithuanian Commonwealth and solemnly declared the establishment of a personal union with the Swedish Empire. King of Sweden Charles X Gustav became Grand Duke of Lithuania. Following this, another act was signed by which the Lithuanian nobility pledged its loyalty to the Swedish Crown. Lithuanian aristocracy was hoping for a union similar to that with Poland. In reality, however, Swedish Lithuania was being set up as a dominicum directum with Jonušas Radvila being promised exceptional rights to certain estates.

Disestablishment 
In due course, Swedish rule began gradually losing support among some members of the Lithuanian nobility. The Swedish administration introduced heavy taxation and was unable to control the brutality of its own army, which soon began treating Lithuania as a conquered land rather than a newly-founded ally. In the spring of 1656, large segments of pro-Polish nobility in Lithuania began revolting against the Swedish, which was followed by the Polish decisive victory against the Swedish Empire in the Battle of Prostki. By 1657, Swedish Lithuania disintegrated. Following this, Grand Hetman of Lithuania and the commander of Swedish forces against Poland Boguslavas Radvila (Bogusław Radziwiłł) faced trial and was exiled to Königsberg.

References 

Lithuania
Former unrecognized countries
Medieval Lithuania
Lithuania–Sweden relations